Summa potestas is a Latin phrase meaning "highest authority" or "totality of power". It refers to the final authority of power in government. For example, the power of the sovereign in an autocracy.

References 

Latin legal terminology